Gimlet Creek may refer to:

Gimlet Creek (Little Crooked Creek), a stream in Missouri
Gimlet Creek (South Dakota), a stream in South Dakota